Bahia de Todos-os-santos: guia de ruas e mistérios de Salvador (Bahia of all-saints: a guide to the streets and mysteries of Salvador) is a book by the Brazilian writer, Jorge Amado, first published in Portuguese in 1945. It has not yet been published in English.

The book is a guide to Salvador in Brazil, known in full as São Salvador da Bahia de Todos os Santos. The author describes both poor and rich neighbourhoods and the city's beaches, as well as the customs of the Afro-Brazilian population and their rituals, such as macumba and candomblé, and the worship of Iemanjá.  The book was first published in 1945, but was revised for subsequent editions to reflect the many changes to the urban environment. It is far from being a normal tourist guide, having been described as "an encyclopedia of what it means to be baiano"  and a “hymn of praise to the city of Bahia”. At the same time, it does not fail to discuss the chronic poverty of the city. Amado in places uses the technique of addressing an imaginary female reader found also in his two biographies, The ABC of Castro Alves and The Knight of Hope, a biography of Luís Carlos Prestes.

References

1945 non-fiction books
Books about Brazil
Travel books